Villaseca is a hamlet located in the municipality of Sotorribas, in Cuenca province, Castilla–La Mancha, Spain. As of 2020, it has a population of 4.

Geography 
Villaseca is located 35km west-northwest of Cuenca, Spain.

References

Populated places in the Province of Cuenca